Mohamed Ashmalee ( Maldivian:  މުހައްމަދު އަޝްމަލީ ) is a Maldivian politician who is a former Minister for State for Finance and Treasury & former Chairman of DHIRAAGU. Prior to this appointment, he served as the Deputy Minister for Finance and Treasury.
He was arrested in July 2021 in Colombo for a "child sex" trafficking case where he was a main offender.

Early career and family life 
Born to Maldivian parents, Mohamed Ashmalee was raised in Male' City. He has one elder brother.

Before pursuing a career in politics, Mohamed Ashmalee held posts from Operations Manager to Managing Director in various public and private sector companies in various fields such as Construction, Tourism, Management, Finance, Information Technology and Medical Management.

Qualifications and Experience 
Mohamed Ashmalee is pursuing his Doctorate Programe in Business Administration and has successfully completed his master's degree in Business Administration specializing in Digital Marketing from Bedfordshire University, U.K. He did his bachelor's degree from Warnborough College in Canterbury, England. Furthermore, he has strong bridging qualifications in the fields of Accounting, Marketing, Financing and Computing.

Mohamed Ashmalee has served as the former State Minister for Finance & Treasury. He has also been the Chairman of DHIRAAGU and national tender board. In addition he headed the National Bureau of Statistics (NBS)[6] under the same ministry. He is also a member of Association of Business Executives U.K. (MABE).

He has a multitude of tasks include supervising the policy and daily operations of Department of National Registration (DNR),[7] National Archives of the Maldives (NAM), National Centre for Information Technology (NCIT) and National Statistics Division (NDS) all of which are under the management of National Bureau of Statistics.

Mohamed Ashmalee has over a decade of experience serving in multifarious operational and managerial capacities, both in public and private sector. In 1994, he began his public service at the Maldives Monetary Authority. After a year, he switched to the private sector until 2013 when he resumed his public service as the Deputy Minister of Transport & Communications. Moreover, he was tasked to superintend the National Centre for Information Technology. In the year 2014, a re-structuring of the government took place which got him appointed as the Deputy Minister of Finance & Treasury. He was also the former Chairman of the National Tender Board.

Political career 
Mohamed Ashmalee is the former Minister of State for Finance & Treasury as well as the Executive Head of the National Bureau of Statistics (NBS) under the same ministry.

He has tasks including supervising the policy and daily operations of Department of National Registration (DNR), National Archives of the Maldives (NAM), National Centre for Information Technology (NCIT) and National Statistics Division (NDS) all of which are under the management of National Bureau of Statistics.

Mohamed Ashmalee is also the Chairperson and Independent/Non-Executive  of Dhiraagu Plc, the largest telecommunications operator in the Maldives.

Corruption 
A special audit of the National Center for Information Technology has revealed corrupt bidding practices in three projects worth over MVR90 million (US$5.8 million).

The NCIT violated public finance regulations in the three projects carried out between 2016 and 2018, according to the audit report published this week.

All three projects were awarded to Maxcom Technologies. The audit implicated former state minister for finance Mohamed Ashmalee in awarding one of the projects without a competitive bidding process.

Ashmalee, a senior member of the former ruling party, was in charge of NCIT during the previous administration.

The audit was carried out at the request of Science, Communication and Technology Minister Mohamed Maleeh Jamal. The findings are now being reviewed by the Anti-Corruption Commission, the watchdog’s spokesman told the Maldives Independent.

According to the audit, an MVR3 million project to buy an uninterrupted power supply system for the national data center was awarded without a bidding process in November 2017. It was awarded through an emergency procurement process with the approval of the finance ministry, which was carried out solely by a state minister in charge of NCIT without any input from NCIT’s procurement department, the audit revealed.

The company was paid half of the project’s cost in advance. But public finance regulations only allows 15 percent as advance payments unless in exceptional circumstances concerning emergencies or national security. The reason for early payment was not explained, the audit noted.

The rest of the payment was made after the UPS systems were supplied but before the company installed them. Payment cheques were signed by the state minister but he did not have the authority to authorise payments on behalf of NCIT, the audit found.

An MVR89 million project to supply and implement Microsoft software licenses and provide training was awarded to the same company in July 2016.

But officials from both the company and its Sri Lankan software supplier were allowed to sit in pre-bid meetings held in February 2016. They took part to “discuss and plan how to carry out the project,” the report stated.

The involvement of a potential bidder in designing the bid was contrary to “competitive tendering processes,” leads to creating the bid in a manner that favours the interests of the company, and offers the company an unfair advantage, the audit said.

Other issues flagged with the project included the lack of a clear schedule for finishing all components despite having a five-year payment schedule. Annual payments were to be made for supplying 20 percent of licenses every year and carrying out training. But there were no details on payment for the third component of the project, which was designing a plan to implement software licenses.

Some 8,305 different software licenses were supplied as of 2018 but only half of these were used. The auditors advised to decide on how to use the licenses before they expired.

As of 2018, MVR50 million of the total MVR89 million was disbursed to the company.

The report also noted complaints by the Sri lankan software supplier over delays in payment from Maxcom. In December 2018, the supplier threatened to revoke the Microsoft reseller status and blacklist the company. The supplier informed the ministry that the payments were finally made in February 2019.

A third project to provide hardware worth MVR4.4 million was awarded to the same company in 2018. Maxcom was the only company to bid for the project but the bid was not announced again as required by public finance regulations in cases where there was a sole bidder.

The same company worked as a consultant to formulate hardware specifications. The audit flagged a conflict of interest as the company bidding for the project had also designed the requirements of the project.

The company took 85 days to complete despite being required to finish in 45 days. The audit noted that the NCIT failed to exact fines of MVR658,101 for the delay.

Sex scandal and arrest in Colombo 
On mid-July 2021, Ashmalee was arrested as he and 4 others were positively identified by a victim of child sex abuse. An additional 41 suspects were arrested by authorities over the Mount Lavinia Child Sex Scandal in early July 2021. During the investigation, it was found that there were more sex trafficking pages advertising minors in the same way.

References 

Government ministers of the Maldives
Maldivian politicians